Colonel Antonio Nicolás Briceño Airport , formerly known as Antonio Nicolas Briceno National Airport, is the main  Trujillo state airport in the Venezuelan Andes, located on Avenida Principal La Hoyada in the municipality of Carvajal, just outside Valera. The airport is named for Antonio Nicolás Briceño (es), a lawyer and officer during the Venezuelan War of Independence.

The Valera non-directional beacon (Ident: VRA) is located on the field.

Airlines and destinations 

On December 29, 2012, during a press conference, executives of Avior Airlines, announced it will reopen flights to this destination, being operated by the subsidiary Avior Regional with two daily flights from Caracas from 1 April 2013. Then on April 7, again during a press conference at the VIP Lounge, Avior Airlines managers  announced postponement of the opening date to Monday, June 15 of the same year.

Services 
The new SAET Director, Anibal Villegas, has made improvements to the airport, including new fuel storage tanks. Currently the Colonel Antonio Nicolás Briceño Airport offers the following services:
 Wi-Fi zone
 Danoi Restaurant Airport
 VIP salon
 Taxi line
 Parking say

Incidents 
 Flight 2197: On August 13, 2012 an ATR 72-212, belonging to Conviasa, with 70 people on board (67 passengers and 3 crew), made a high-speed aborted takeoff, resulting in a runway excursion ending very close to a ravine. The passengers walked off the plane on their own and made their way back to the airport. There was strong fuel odor. This incident resulted in one unharmed person and 69 others that sustained minor injuries. The aircraft suffered damage on its fuselage.

See also
Transport in Venezuela
List of airports in Venezuela

References

External links
OurAirports - Valera
SkyVector - Valera

Airports in Venezuela
Buildings and structures in Trujillo (state)